José Jurado (1899–1971)  was a professional golfer in the sport’s Golden Age.  Born in Buenos Aires, he was the first Argentine to travel to major international championships and is thus often credited as  the “Father of Argentine Professional Golf” or the “Godfather of Argentinean Golf.”  He is perhaps best known for his losing stroke to Tommy Armour at the 1931 Open Championship at Carnoustie.   Jurado was personal friends with the Prince of Wales, who was reportedly enraged by his double bogey that lost him the championship.

Career

Jurado began his career as a caddie at The Royal and Ancient Golf Club of St Andrews.  At the age of 21, he won his first of seven championships at the Argentine Open, and was also a seven-time winner of the Argentine PGA Championship.  In 1932, Jurado traveled to the US, justifying these journeys as the only way to progress his skill as a professional golfer.  After studying the operations of the American PGA, he undertook the organization of the AAPG (Asociación Argentina de Profesionales de Golf). Jurado also recruited international golf figures to teach Argentine enthusiasts the emerging and popular American-style swing. In 1931 he won an exhibition match against Aubrey Boomer in France. Jurado finished in the top ten in four majors: T8 at the British Open in 1926, T6 in the British Open in 1928, 2nd in the British Open in 1931 and 6th in the U.S. Open in 1932.

In literature
Jurado is referenced in The Book of Golfers: A Biographical History of the Royal & Ancient Game, by Daniel Wexler.  The book is an encyclopedia of the most important golfers since the 15th century, and in it Jurado is described as “... a golfing pioneer in the truest sense, for while early British professionals ventured out to parts unknown with the psychological might of the world’s biggest empire (both golfing and otherwise) behind them, Jurado traveled thousands of miles to challenge the British golf monolith on its own turf.”

Jurado is also referenced in the 2005 biography Sir Walter: Walter Hagen and the Invention of Professional Golf, by Thomas Clavin.  The biography details the life and career of Walter Hagen, who won eleven major professional golf tournaments over his career.  In the book, Jurado is described as having “demonstrated the tango” to a group of 1933 Ryder Cup golfers at a dancehall in Southport, UK.  Jurado, who was there for the British Open, apparently “won the (dance) contest”.

Tournament wins
this list may be incomplete
all tournaments in Argentina
1920 Argentine Open
1921 Argentine PGA Championship
1922 Argentine PGA Championship
1924 Argentine Open, South Open
1925 Argentine Open, Argentine PGA Championship, South Open
1927 Argentine Open, Argentine PGA Championship
1928 Argentine Open, Argentine PGA Championship
1929 Argentine Open, Argentine PGA Championship, Center Open
1931 Argentine Open
1932 South Open
1933 South Open
1936 Center Open
1937 Argentine PGA Championship
1938 Palermo Masters

Results in major championships

Note: Jurado never played in the Masters Tournament nor the PGA Championship.

"T" indicates a tie for a place

Team appearances
Great Britain–Argentina Professional Match (representing Argentina): 1939 (captain)

Suggested reading
The Book of Golfers: A Biographical History of the Royal & Ancient Game, by Daniel Wexler (Ann Arbor Media Group, 2005) , 
Sir Walter: Walter Hagen and the Invention of Professional Golf, by Thomas Clavin (Simon and Schuster, 2005) ,

References

Argentine male golfers
Sportspeople from Buenos Aires
1899 births
1971 deaths